Krishna Kishorenagar is a village in West Tripura District, Tripura, India. The population is 9,244. 4,791 people are male. 4,453 are female.

References

Villages in West Tripura district